Multiwavelength optical networking (MONET), is a method for communicating digital information using lasers over optical fiber.  The method provides the next level of communication networks after SONET optical networks. MONET optical networks provide an even greater bandwidth capacity. This new method employs wave division multiplexing (WDM) technology for transporting large amounts of telephone and data traffic and  allow for interoperability between equipment from different vendors.

First developed by the secretive National Security Agency as author James Bamford points out in his book, "Body of Secrets: Anatomy of the Ultra-Secret National Security Agency".  It was also discussed at the 1996 Military Communications Conference.

References
Multiwavelength Optical Networking Consortium (broken)
Multiwavelength Optical Networks - A layered Approach by Thomas E. Stern and Krishna Bala
Body of Secrets: Anatomy of the Ultra-Secret National Security Agency by James Bamford
Military Communications Conference, 1996

Synchronous optical networking
Fiber-optic communications
Network protocols